Teja (born Jasti Dharma Teja; 22 February 1966) is an Indian cinematographer turned director and screenwriter, known for his work primarily in Telugu cinema. He ventured into direction with hits such as Chitram, Nuvvu Nenu, and Jayam. He has garnered several state Nandi Awards, and Filmfare Award for Best Director – Telugu for Nuvvu Nenu.

Teja debuted as cinematographer with Ram Gopal Varma's 1992 bilingual film Raat, for which he won Nandi Award for Best Cinematography. As a cinematographer, He is known for his works in films such as Baazi, Ghulam, Sangharsh, Jis Desh Mein Ganga Rehta Hain, Krodh, Krishna, Shastra, Rakshak, Money, Tere Mere Sapne, and Vishwavidhaata. Teja also worked as a crew member in films such as Kshana Kshanam, Rangeela, Drohi, Antham, Gaayam, and Govinda Govinda.

Early life
Teja was born on 22 February 1966 in Madras (now Chennai) of Tamil Nadu in an affluent family. His father J.B.K. Chowdhary was an industrialist and exporter, based primarily in Tokyo, Japan. Chowdhary suffered heavy losses in his business which forced Teja to start working at an early age.

Teja identifies himself as anti-caste, anti-religion, and anti-region. He has legally dropped his surname for the same reason.

Career 

Teja doing any work he could get, ended up working in Tamil film shoots as a lighting assistant. After working in lighting and sound departments he moved into the camera department and worked under Ravikant Nagaich, and W.B. Rao. He then took up assignments for documentaries presented in National Geographic Channel. He then joined the bandwagon of Bollywood.

Working as cinematographer, Teja used to frequently schedule Hindi film shoots in Hyderabad, Andhra Pradesh as to spend more time with his wife and son. Many schedules were planned in Ramoji Film City. Chitram, Teja's directorial debut was planned entirely in Ramoji Film City on budget of forty lakh rupees. The film became a huge hit and paved way for a variety of new age romantic films in Tollywood. Teja gained notability post the release of Nuvvu Nenu, an all-time blockbuster and that year's highest grosser. The film received six Nandi Awards and had a total run of three seventy five days. The film was also remade in Hindi starring Tushar Kapoor and Anita Hassanandani.

Teja's next film was Nijam, was released in 2003 starring Mahesh Babu and Rakshitha in lead roles. Nijam was a low grosser at the box office but gained critical appraise. In the following year, Teja made Jai. Actor Navdeep debuted with the film, he was paired with Santhoshini and Ayesha Jhulka. It was dubbed in Tamil as Jairam. The film had an average run in both the languages.

Teja later directed Dhairyam and Avunanna Kaadanna, simultaneously. Halfway through Dhairyam'''s shoot, Teja dropped the project stating that the producer, N. Sudhakar Reddy, Nithiin's father, had changed and edited a part of the film without his consent. Teja returned his remuneration, arranged a press meet, and declared that he had nothing to do with the film. Dhairyam failed at the box office, whereas Avunanna Kadanna had a seventy-five-day run and was declared a hit.

Film distribution
Teja also set up Chitram movies distribution offices in Hyderabad and Vizag. He distributed films such as Harry Potter and the Order of the Phoenix, Harry Potter and the Goblet of Fire, Spider-Man 2, Spider-Man 3, Pirates of the Caribbean: At World's End, Pirates of the Caribbean: Dead Man's Chest, The Fast and the Furious: Tokyo Drift'' and many others in Nizam and other districts.

Personal life
Aurov Teja, Teja's younger son, died of prolonged illness in Hyderabad on Saturday, 19 March 2011.
Aurov had been suffering from breathing problems and cerebral palsy, caused by faulty medical procedures followed by the hospital at the time of birth. The baby was taken to Beijing, China, New York, United States and Berlin, Germany for medical treatment. On the morning of 19 March 2011, the baby's condition deteriorated and was pronounced dead at 12:11 local time.

Filmography

As a writer, director or producer

As a cinematographer

References

External links
 

1966 births
Living people
Film directors from Chennai
Telugu film cinematographers
Hindi film cinematographers
Telugu film directors
Filmfare Awards South winners
Nandi Award winners
CineMAA Awards winners
Cinematographers from Tamil Nadu
Screenwriters from Chennai
Film producers from Chennai
21st-century Indian film directors
20th-century Indian photographers
21st-century Indian photographers